Anastas Ngjela (3 March 1934 – 24 July 1999) was an Albanian pilot of First Class and the Colonel of Military Air Forces, of Albania Republic.

Life 
Anastas Ngjela grew up in an Albanian family in a small village in Gjirokastër in Sheper later he moved to the capital Tirana. He was initially enrolled in the seven-year school "11 Janari"; then entered the "Skënderbej" military high school and, after that, the "Enver Hoxha" United Officers School, also in Tirana. In 1952, Anastasi, together with a group of friends, left for the Soviet aviation school. He was organized and began his theoretical studies at the Soviet school in the city of Borisoglebsk, Voronezh region, which is named after Valery Chkalov.

The first flight missions 

In 1957, Anastas Ngjella and his friend Mahmut Hysa got their first combat mission against a United States Air Force fighter pilot who was a NATO pilot. He and his friend were told that an American fighter pilot from the United States Air Force allegedly violated the airspace in Albania. Anastas Ngjela and his friend Mahmut Hysa immediately got ready and took off. The American Lockheed T-33 jet was surrounded and forced to land on the unfinished runway at Rinas Airport. The plane was impounded and the American pilot Major Howard J. Curran was arrested.

References 

20th-century Albanian military personnel
1934 births
1999 deaths